Devuan is a fork of the Debian Linux distribution that uses sysvinit, runit or OpenRC instead of systemd. Devuan aims to avoid "lock-in" by projects like systemd and aims to maintain compatibility with other init systems to avoid detaching Linux from other Unix systems.

History
With the release of Debian 8 some developers and users were alienated due to the project's adoption of systemd and subsequent removal of support for other existing init systems. This decision prompted some Debian community members to start a fork of Debian without systemd.

Instead of continuing the Debian practice of using Toy Story character names as release codenames, Devuan aliases its releases using planet names. The first stable release shared the Debian 8 codename Jessie. However, the Devuan release was named for minor planet 10464.

The first stable release of Devuan was published on May 25, 2017.

Devuan 2.0.0 ASCII was released on June 9, 2018, and 2.1 ASCII was released on November 21, 2019. ASCII provides a choice of five different desktop environments at install time (XFCE, Cinnamon, KDE, LXQt, MATE), while many other window managers are available from the repositories. It also provides installation options for choosing between sysvinit and OpenRC for init, and between GRUB and LILO for the boot loader. Devuan maintains a modified version of the Debian expert text installer, which has the ability to install only free software if the user chooses, while the live desktop image also uses a custom graphical installer from Refracta, a derivative of Devuan.

Devuan 3.0 Beowulf was released on June 3, 2020, based on Debian 10.4. Ppc64el has been added to the list of supported architectures. Runit is now available as an alternative init. Eudev and elogind are now used to replace some Systemd functionality.

Devuan 4.0 Chimaera was released October 14, 2021. It is based on Debian Bullseye (11.1) with Linux kernel 5.10.

Packages
Devuan has its own package repository which mirrors upstream Debian, with local modifications made only when needed to allow for init systems other than systemd. Devuan does not provide systemd in its repositories but still retains libsystemd0 until it has removed all dependencies.

Amprolla is the program used to merge Debian packages with Devuan packages. It downloads packages from Debian and merges changes to packages that Devuan overrides.

Derivatives 
In August 2022, Peppermint OS announced the release of Devuan-based ISO's, alongside their Debian-based ISO's.

Exe GNU/Linux is a Devuan derivative (since 2017) featuring the Trinity Desktop Environment and another LXDE version.

Star is another Devuan-based Linux distribution featuring several lightweight window managers, such as Openbox, Fluxbox, JWM, and i3.

Version history

Source:

Notes

References

External links

Devuan home page
Source code repository
Release archive

Debian-based distributions
Linux distributions
Linux distributions without systemd